Rockingham High School may refer to:

East Rockingham High School in Elkton, Virginia
Rockingham County High School in Reidsville, North Carolina
Rockingham Senior High School in Rockingham, Western Australia